Consolida armeniaca is an annual flowering plant of the family Ranunculaceae.

External links

armeniaca
Flora of Western Asia